An election to Llanelli Borough Council was held in May 1983.  It was preceded by the 1979 election and followed by the 1987 election. On the same day there were elections to the other local authorities and community councils in Wales.

Results

Llanelli Borough Ward One (three seats)

Llanelli Borough Ward Two (three seats)

Llanelli Borough Ward Three (three seats)

Llanelli Borough Ward Four (three seats)

Llanelli Borough Ward Five (three seats)

Llanelli Borough Ward Six (three seats)

Llanelli Borough Ward Seven (three seats)

Llanelli Borough Ward Eight (three seats)

Llanelli Borough Ward Nine (three seats)

Llanelli Borough Ward Ten (three seats)
The election delayed due to death of candidate and was held some weeks later.

Llanelli Borough Ward Eleven (three seats)

References

Llanelli Borough Council elections
Llanelli Borough Council election